Iontha is a genus of moths of the family Erebidae. The genus was erected by Edward Doubleday in 1842.

Species
Iontha acerces L. B. Prout, 1928 Sumatra
Iontha ida Banks, 1919 Philippines (Luzon)
Iontha umbrina E. Doubleday, 1842 Bengal, Singapore, Borneo

References

Calpinae